Karimabad (also Romanized as Karīmābād; also known as Karamābād) is a village in Yanqaq Rural District in the Central District of Galikash County, Golestan Province, Iran. At the 2006 census, its population was 369, in 91 families.

References 

Populated places in Galikash County